Ubiquitin-associated and SH3 domain-containing protein A is a protein that in humans is encoded by the UBASH3A gene.

References

Further reading